Telephanus is a genus of beetles in the family Silvanidae, containing the following species:

 Telephanus acrolophus Thomas
 Telephanus aculeatus Nevermann
 Telephanus acuminatus Grouvelle
 Telephanus agilis Grouvelle
 Telephanus alluaudi Grouvelle
 Telephanus americanus Olivier
 Telephanus apicalis Grouvelle
 Telephanus applanatus Nevermann
 Telephanus argentatus Reitter
 Telephanus armatus Grouvelle
 Telephanus assmanni Nevermann
 Telephanus barberi Nevermann
 Telephanus basiliscus Nevermann
 Telephanus bipunctatus Schauffuss
 Telephanus blairi Nevermann
 Telephanus brontoides Sharp
 Telephanus bruchi Grouvelle
 Telephanus bucephalus Nevermann
 Telephanus buphthalmus Nevermann
 Telephanus cedius Schauffuss
 Telephanus centralis Sharp
 Telephanus immaculatus Sharp
 Telephanus ceraunoides Nevermann
 Telephanus consimilis Nevermann
 Telephanus costaricensis Nevermann
 Telephanus nigricornis Nevermann
 Telephanus cribratus Grouvelle
 Telephanus crux Grouvelle
 Telephanus cubanus Nevermann
 Telephanus darlingtoni Nevermann
 Telephanus declivis Nevermann
 Telephanus decoratus Grouvelle
 Telephanus dentatus Nevermann
 Telephanus diabolicus Nevermann
 Telephanus dilutus Reitter
 Telephanus dromioides Sharp
 Telephanus dubitalis Grouvelle
 Telephanus dubius Grouvelle
 Telephanus elongatus Grouvelle
 Telephanus fallax Grouvelle
 Telephanus flohri Nevermann
 Telephanus glycerius Nevermann
 Telephanus gomyi Thomas
 Telephanus gracilicornis Sharp
 Telephanus gracilis Schaufuss
 Telephanus grossicornis Nevermann
 Telephanus guadelupensis Grouvelle
 Telephanus guanacasteco Nevermann
 Telephanus haitianus Nevermann
 Telephanus haroldi Schauffuss
 Telephanus hirsutus Nevermann
 Telephanus horridus Nevermann
 Telephanus humeralifer Nevermann
 Telephanus humerosus Reitter
 Telephanus igrolateralis Nevermann
 Telephanus insignis Grouvelle
 Telephanus juvencus Nevermann
 Telephanus kuntzeni Nevermann
 Telephanus lecontei Casey
 Telephanus leptos Nevermann
 Telephanus longulus Nevermann
 Telephanus megacephalus Nevermann
 Telephanus melanchlorus Nevermann
 Telephanus melanocephalus Grouvelle
 Telephanus mexicanus Sharp
 Telephanus micans Grouvelle
 Telephanus minutus Grouvelle
 Telephanus niger Reitter
 Telephanus nigricollis Sharp
 Telephanus nigroflavus Nevermann
 Telephanus nodicornis Nevermannn
 Telephanus obscurus Grouvelle
 Telephanus ornatus Reitter
 Telephanus ovalis Grouvelle
 Telephanus pallidulus Chevrolat
 Telephanus pallidus Reitter
 Telephanus panamensis Nevermann
 Telephanus paradoxus Reitter
 Telephanus parallelus Grouvelle
 Telephanus parvulus Grouvelle
 Telephanus pilicornis Reitter
 Telephanus procerulus Reitter
 Telephanus pubescens Grouvelle
 Telephanus pulchellus Reitter
 Telephanus pygmaeus Nevermann
 Telephanus quadripunctatus Schaufuss
 Telephanus reductus Schauffuss
 Telephanus ruficollis Nevermann
 Telephanus sahlbergi Grouvelle
 Telephanus scabrosicollis Nevermann
 Telephanus schwarzi Nevermann
 Telephanus sellatus Sharp
 Telephanus serratus Nevermann
 Telephanus setulosus Sharp
 Telephanus sharpi Arrow
 Telephanus signatus Grouvelle
 Telephanus silvestris Nevermann
 Telephanus similis Grouvelle
 Telephanus simplicicollis Sharp
 Telephanus spinosus Grouvelle
 Telephanus squalidus Nevermann
 Telephanus strictus Grouvelle
 Telephanus subpubescens Grouvelle
 Telephanus tabaciphilus Nevermann
 Telephanus terminatus Grouvelle
 Telephanus titschacki Nevermann
 Telephanus turrialbensis Nevermann
 Telephanus velox Haldeman
 Telephanus wahlbergi Grouvelle

References

Silvanidae genera